Elections to the Ettrick and Lauderdale District Council took place in May 1992, alongside elections to the councils of Scotland's various other districts.

Aggregate results

References

Ettrick and Lauderdale District Council elections
1992 Scottish local elections